Masuccio is both a given name and a surname. Notable people with the name include:

 Masuccio Primo, Italian architect and sculptor of the 13th century
 Masuccio Salernitano, Italian poet
 Masuccio Segondo, Italian architect of the 14th century period
 Natale Masuccio, Italian architect and Jesuit

See also 

 Masucci